Elizabeth Hill may refer to:
 Elizabeth Hill (swimmer) (born 1985), American swimmer
 Elizabeth Hill (linguist) (1900–1996), Russian-born British academic linguist
 Elizabeth Hill (screenwriter) (1901–1978), American screenwriter
 Elizabeth "Liz" Hill (active from 1983), American swimming coach, see Denny Hill and Liz Hill
 Elizabeth Hill (figure skater), American skater, see 1996 United States Figure Skating Championships

See also 
 Betty Hill (disambiguation)
 Elizabeth Hill Boone (born 1948), American art historian, ethnohistorian and academic
 Hill (surname)